Jean-Jacques Werner  (20 January 1935 – 22 October 2017) was a French conductor and composer of modern music.

Parallel to his life as a composer, his career as a conductor began in 1960, with the firm desire to make the works of his time known. He conducts the orchestras of the Radiodiffusion-Télévision Française, the chamber orchestra, the lyrical orchestra, the Orchestre philharmonique de Radio France and the Orchestre national de France, among others.

Biography 
Born in Strasbourg, Werner was the eldest of five children. Neither his mother Lucie Lamszus, nor his father Marcel Werner were particularly musicians. He studied music for the first time at the conservatoire in his hometown where he successively won first prizes for harp, horn and orchestral conducting. He then continued his studies at the Schola Cantorum de Paris in Pierre Wissmer's, Daniel Lesur's and Léon Barzin's classes.

Werner died in Barr (Bas-Rhin) at age 82.

Selected discography 
 Works by Jean-Jacques Werner published by Ctésibios (www.ctesibios.fr) Disques Ctesibios
Triptyque for organ, Canticum for flute and organ, Spiritual for violin and organ, Le cantique de Siméon for organ, Psaume VIII for choir and organ. Frédéric Werner (flute), Elsa Grether (violin), Maîtrise Notre-Dame de Paris: Lionel Sow, Béatrice Piertot and Yannick Merlin (organ): Notre-Dame des Champs and Église Saint-Antoine-des-Quinze-Vingts in Paris

Publications 
 Jean-Jacques Werner: Diriger, composer, former

Bibliography 
 Michaël Andrieu, Jean-Jacques Werner, mille ponts entre un homme et sa musique, éditions Delatour, 2009

References

External links 
 Jean-Jacques Werner's Official website
 Discography (Discogs)
 Exhibition Jean-Jacques Werner at the Bibliothèque nationale 
 Jean-Jacques Werner (ForumPro)
 Jean-Jacques Werner, catalogue of works
 Décès de Jean-Jacques Werner, compositeur de l’opéra "Luther ou le Mendiant de la Grâce" 
 In Memoriam - Jean-Jacques Werner
 Madigan Square, composed by Jean-Jacques Werner (YouTube)

1935 births
2017 deaths
Musicians from Strasbourg
Schola Cantorum de Paris alumni
20th-century French composers
21st-century French composers
French male conductors (music)
Officiers of the Ordre des Arts et des Lettres
20th-century French conductors (music)
20th-century French male musicians
21st-century French male musicians